Lecitus Smith (born July 13, 1998) is an American football guard for the Arizona Cardinals of the National Football League (NFL). He played college football at Virginia Tech.

College career 
Smith played college football at Virginia Tech. He redshirted his freshman year in 2017. In 2018, he played in 11 games with 4 starts. In 2019, Smith started 12 games as left guard and was voted 2019 All-ACC Honorable Mention (Official ACC). In 2020, Smith started all 11 games as left guard and was again voted to All-ACC Honorable Mention (Official ACC). In 2021, Smith returned for his fifth year.

Professional career

Smith was drafted by the Arizona Cardinals in the sixth round (215th overall) of the 2022 NFL Draft.

References

External links
 Arizona Cardinals bio
 Virginia Tech Hokies bio

1998 births
Living people
American football offensive linemen
Virginia Tech Hokies football players
Arizona Cardinals players